Heavy Nova may refer to
Heavy Nova (album), an album by Robert Palmer
Heavy Nova (video game), a game on the Sega Mega-CD platform